Brahmanand College Kanpur (B N D College)  is a college in Kanpur. It is located on Mall Road near Mare Company pul (originally called Muir Mill Company Bridge) Kanpur, Uttar Pradesh in India. 
It is a government aided college and affiliated to CSJM University, Kanpur.

History
BND College was established in the year 1961 by Kanyakubja Education Trust. Initially, it was known as 'Kanyakubja College' which was later renamed as Brahmanad College in the memory of its founder Pt. Brahmanand Mishra in the year 1968. Starting with just 49 Students, today the college is providing education to more than 4000 students.

Faculties
Science 
Law
Commerce

Courses
Government aided 
B.Sc.--Physics, Chemistry, Mathematics, Zoology and Botany, Computer science
LL.B.
M.Sc.--Physics, Chemistry

Self financed
B.Sc.--Industrial Chemistry, Physical Education, Computer Application, Biotechnology
B.Com.
M.Sc.--Mathematics, Zoology, Botany, Biochemistry, Biotechnology, Industrial Chemistry

Facilities
Laboratories 
NCC

References

Universities and colleges in Kanpur
Colleges affiliated to Chhatrapati Shahu Ji Maharaj University
Educational institutions established in 1961
1961 establishments in Uttar Pradesh